Gymnopilus chrysotrichoides is a species of mushroom in the family Hymenogastraceae.

Description

Habitat and distribution
Gymnopilus chrysotrichoides has been found growing on coconut logs, in Cuba in October.

See also

List of Gymnopilus species

References

External links
Gymnopilus chrysotrichoides at Index Fungorum

chrysotrichoides
Fungi of North America
Taxa named by William Alphonso Murrill